Íris Tanja Ívars Flygenring (born 12 November 1989) is an Icelandic actress. She is best known for her performance as Ása in the Netflix TV series Katla. She graduated from the Iceland University of the Arts in 2016. In 2021, she appeared as one of the main characters the third season of Trapped.

Personal life
Íris is the daughter of actor Valdimar Örn Flygenring.
She has a son, born in 2010  and a daughter, born in 2017.
She is engaged with Elín Eyþórsdóttir, one of the band members from Systur, a folk music band consisting of three sisters. She performed with Hatari as a touring dancer in 2022, when Ástrós Guðjónsdóttir left the band and went to her motherhood life, due to her pregnancies.

Filmography

References

External links

1989 births
Living people
Icelandic actresses